Richard Fitzpatrick may refer to:

Richard FitzPatrick (1748–1813), Anglo-Irish soldier, wit, poet and politician
Richard Fitzpatrick (cinematographer) (born 1970), Australian cinematographer and marine biologist
Richard FitzPatrick, 1st Baron Gowran (died 1727), British naval captain
Spike Fitzpatrick (Richard S. Fitzpatrick, 1948–2006), American lawyer

See also 
 Richie Fitzpatrick (1880–1904), American gangster 
 Fitzpatrick (surname)
 Fitzpatrick (disambiguation)